John Bliss (October 8, 1930 – February 28, 2008) was an American actor known for playing the role of the 8th grade Social Studies teacher and former Principal Irving Pal on Ned's Declassified School Survival Guide. He was also seen in the first episode of Out of Jimmy's Head. He fondly remembered George Clooney, and how George was so polite and called him "Mr. Bliss" and offered him food on the set of Intolerable Cruelty, in which they both appeared.

Bliss played Mr. Pickering in the TV series Andy Richter Controls the Universe.

He guest starred as a character called Emile in an episode of TV series Get Smart called Bronzefinger.

He had many stories to tell of his life's adventures, and was a very talented actor. During some of his storytelling, he told us he was born to acting parents in Peoria, Illinois, but moved from time to time (Florida, New York, Europe). When he was a child, acting on the stage with his parents, they rarely told others of their true profession of acting, because it was "looked down upon in those days."

John died on February 28, 2008, from complications of aortic aneurysm. He was 77.

Filmography

External links

1930 births
2008 deaths
American male film actors
American male stage actors
American male television actors
Actors from Peoria, Illinois
20th-century American male actors